Elizabeth Bartlet may refer to:

 Elizabeth Bartlet (musicologist) (1948–2005), Canadian musicologist
 Elizabeth Bartlet Westin (created 2003), a character on The West Wing

See also 
 Elizabeth Bartlett (disambiguation)